Billy Hector (born 1956) is an American blues guitarist and singer-songwriter from Orange, New Jersey.

History
Hector considers himself a working man's musician. He was initially lured into the music world after seeing the Beatles on the Ed Sullivan Show. He says this changed his world. He soon found himself drawn to the blues. He started taking guitar lessons at age 9, and later studied jazz guitar and music history at William Paterson University.

Hector started playing regularly in a blues band in 1985. He has been producing albums for over 20 years while performing primarily in small clubs.

Hector's guitar style is a combination of Jersey Shore blues and rock n roll.

As of 2013, his band consisted of Hector on guitar and vocals, Timmy Tindall on bass, and Dan Hickey on drums.

Hector received the Best Guitarist Award from music critic Bob Makin of The Aquarian Weeklys East Coast Rocker section twice. He is also the recipient of three Asbury Park Music Awards: "Best Guitarist", "Best Blues Band" and the "Living Legend." Hector and his band were billed alongside Bonnie Raitt at The Rock and Roll Hall of Fame's "Tribute to Muddy Waters".

Hector has played with B. B. King, Bo Diddley, Johnny Winter, Buddy Guy, Dr. John, and The Fabulous Thunderbirds, but is most at home in small clubs. He was the touring guitarist for Hubert Sumlin and Joe Louis Walker.

He appeared in the movie Hellhound on My Trail backing Sonny Landreth, and in One Way Out.

Discography
1988 (45 rpm single) "Your Time Is At Hand" / "If You Love Me Like You Say (You Wouldn't Treat Me Like You Do)"
1989 All The Way Live
1993 Wild, Wild Beast
1993 And The Crowd Went Wild!!!
1994 Cold Wind
1997 Hard to Please
2000 What Can a Poor Boy Do?
2001 Duct Tape Life
2002 Busy Man
2002 Undertow
2003 Stonehenge
2003 Out of Order
2005 Alive and Kickin'''
2007 Hard Rockin' Blues2009 Traveler2013 Choice Cuts2014 Fire Within2015 Old School Thang2019 Someday Baby 
2022 Rock Night in Jersey''

References

1956 births
Living people
American folk singers
American male singer-songwriters
American rock guitarists
American blues guitarists
American male guitarists
Jersey Shore musicians
People from Orange, New Jersey
Singer-songwriters from New Jersey
Guitarists from New Jersey
20th-century American guitarists
20th-century American male musicians